Guillaume Graechen (born 1977) is a French retired footballer who played as a midfield. He  was the manager for Hoàng Anh Gia Lai

References 

1977 births
Living people
French footballers
Association football midfielders
French football managers